Helena Dorothea von Schönberg (1729-1799), was a German business person. She managed a knitting factory on her manor in Silesia and are regarded as the founder of the later well known stocking knitting industry in Saxony.

References
 http://www.vonschoenberg.org/geschichte/helenadorothea.htm

18th-century German businesspeople
18th-century German businesswomen
1729 births
1799 deaths
People of the Industrial Revolution
German industrialists
18th-century industrialists